Paraponera is a genus of ants and the only genus in the subfamily Paraponerinae. The name means "near-Ponera".

It consists of two species: the extant Paraponera clavata, also known as a bullet ant, found in the Neotropics, and the very small fossil species Paraponera dieteri known from Dominican amber (Early Miocene; 16-19 million years ago). Bullet ants are so named for the pain caused by their venomous stings. The intensely painful sting is toxic to invertebrates as well as vertebrates and a major component is the neurotoxic peptide poneratoxin.

Species
 Paraponera clavata (Fabricius, 1775)
 †Paraponera dieteri Baroni Urbani, 1994

References

External links

Paraponerinae
Ant genera
Messinian genera
Zanclean genera
Piacenzian genera
Gelasian genera
Calabrian genera
Ionian genera
Tarantian genera
Holocene genera